Young Eisner Scholars (YES) is a nonprofit organization dedicated to identifying underserved students and providing them with resources and support to facilitate their success in high school, college, and beyond.

History
Eric Eisner started identifying students from the Lennox School District in Los Angeles in 1998.  The organization became established as a 501(c)3 nonprofit organization in 2010.  Services expanded to New York City in 2012, Chicago in 2014, and the Appalachian region in 2015.

Impact
YES takes on about 60 new students each year and currently serves over 500 students.  YES has disbursed over $75 million in scholarships and financial aid as of June 2017.

References

Education in California
Educational charities based in the United States